Valery Kazakouski (born 14 July 2000) is a Belarusian and Lithuanian (from August 2019) chess player who holds the title of Grandmaster (GM, 2022).

Biography 
Valery Kazakouski was one of the leading young Belarusian chess players. He has been representing Lithuania since 2019. Valery Kazakouski has won 2 silver medals at the Lithuanian Chess Championships (2020, 2022).

Valery Kazakouski won international chess tournaments in Saint Petersburg (2019) and Panevėžys (2021).

Valery Kazakouski played for Lithuania in the Chess Olympiad:
 In 2022, at reserve board in the 44th Chess Olympiad in Chennai (+6, =1, -2).

Valery Kazakouski played for Lithuania in the European Team Chess Championship:
 In 2021, at second board in the 23rd European Team Chess Championship in Čatež ob Savi (+5, =2, -0).

In 2015, Valery Kazakouski was awarded the FIDE International Master (IM) title and received the FIDE Grandmaster (GM) title seven years later.

References

External links 

2000 births
Living people
Chess grandmasters
Lithuanian chess players
Belarusian chess players